Alsény Bangoura (born 10 March 1993) is a Guinean international footballer who plays , as a right back.

Career
He has played club football for CO de Bamako, AS Kaloum Star and Horoya AC.

He made his international debut for Guinea in 2015.

References

1993 births
Living people
Guinean footballers
Guinea international footballers
CO de Bamako players
AS Kaloum Star players
Horoya AC players
Khaleej FC players
Saudi First Division League players
Association football fullbacks
Guinean expatriate footballers
Guinean expatriate sportspeople in Mali
Expatriate footballers in Mali
Guinean expatriate sportspeople in Saudi Arabia
Expatriate footballers in Saudi Arabia
Malian Première Division players
Guinée Championnat National players
Guinea A' international footballers
2016 African Nations Championship players
2018 African Nations Championship players